Carl van Geyzel (19 December 1902 – 18 January 1971) was a British and Sri Lankan athlete and cricketer. He competed in the men's high jump at the 1928 Summer Olympics. His Ceylon national record in the high jump stood for more than 25 years. He also played in two first-class cricket matches in the 1920s, including one for Cambridge University Cricket Club.

See also
 List of Cambridge University Cricket Club players

References

1902 births
1971 deaths
Athletes (track and field) at the 1928 Summer Olympics
English cricketers
Sri Lankan male high jumpers
British male high jumpers
Olympic athletes of Great Britain
Cambridge University cricketers
People from British Ceylon
Sportspeople from Colombo